Rineloricaria quadrensis is a species of catfish in the family Loricariidae. It is native to South America, where it occurs in coastal streams and freshwater lagoons between Tramandaí and Torres in the state of Rio Grande do Sul in Brazil. The species reaches 14.7 cm (5.8 inches) in standard length and is believed to be a facultative air-breather.

References 

Loricariidae
Fish described in 1983
Catfish of South America
Fish of Brazil